Elisabeth Mason is an American lawyer and venture philanthropist. She is the Founding Director of the Stanford Technology, Opportunity and Poverty Lab at Stanford University. She is also the co-founder and former Chief Executive Officer of Single Stop USA, a nonprofit that promotes economic mobility by connecting people to untapped US Government benefits.

Mason has received numerous awards, including two White House Social Innovation Awards and the Robin Hood Foundation Heroes Award. NY1 named Mason "New Yorker of the Year" in 2015 for her work on anti-poverty initiatives directed at low-income New Yorkers.

Prior to co-founding Single Stop USA, Mason was a Managing Director at the Robin Hood Foundation and practiced law at Cleary, Gottlieb, Steen & Hamilton in New York.

Early life and education 
Mason was raised in East Harlem. She earned a bachelor's degree from Harvard College and a master's degree from the Harvard's Graduate School of Education. She holds a J.D. degree from Columbia University.
 
When she was in College, Mason spent a semester in India, where she worked with Mother Teresa's nuns in a leper colony. After graduating, she joined the Peace Corps and was posted to Costa Rica.

In 1991, she founded Fundacion Kukula, an agency that helped poor youth and their families. Mason served as the Executive Director of the organisation until 1996 and spent seven years in Latin America. During her tenure with Fundación Kukula, she was one of the Founding Members of the Central American branch of the Latin American Children's Movement.

Career 
After graduating from Columbia University, Mason joined Cleary, Gottlieb, Steen & Hamilton and worked there for one year. In 1999, she joined the Robin Hood Foundation as Managing Director. At Robin Hood, she worked closely with low-income families in New York City and helped found New York's Earned Income Tax Campaign, which has since delivered over $1 billion in tax credits to low-income New Yorkers. Robin Hood’s remit does not extend beyond New York City.

In 2005, Mason joined Atlantic Philanthropies as Senior Advisor. At Atlantic Philanthropies, she helped develop a $1 billion, 10-year spend-down plan to help disadvantaged children. In 2006, she co-founded Single Stop USA, an organisation that helps low-income individuals by assessing their conditions and connecting them to available non-profit programs. A New York-based version of Single Stop had been incubated at Robin Hood; Mason founded Single Stop USA in order to expand the program nationwide.

During her time as the CEO of Single Stop, Mason won several awards and Single Stop grew to have 113 locations in the US. The organization received two White House Social Innovation Fund grants, was named among the Top Ten in Global Social Impact from Fast Company and was called "one of the big ideas in social change" by The New York Times.  Mason stepped down from the position of CEO of Single Stop in 2015 and took an advisory board member role. In September 2015, she joined the Stanford Center on Poverty and Inequality, and in 2016 founded the Stanford Technology, Opportunity & Poverty Lab, later renamed the Stanford Poverty and Technology Lab.

Mason has served as an advisor to the United Nations and to local and international agencies on various human and children’s rights, legislative reform, juvenile justice, and community and youth development programs. She has co-authored two papers, Connecting the Dots: Community Colleges, Children, and Our Country’s Future, a book chapter in Big Ideas: Game Changers for Children and Improving Health, Human Services, and Education Outcomes and Reducing Poverty. She is also a contributing author at the Huffington Post on issues of education and social policy.

In February 2019, Mason was featured in a World Bank special session broadcast live in 180 countries on the emerging issues in Digital Technologies and Inclusive Development.

References

External links 
Elisabeth Mason on Huffington Post
New lab works to reduce global poverty through tech
Stanford, The White House, And Tech Bigwigs Will Host A Summit On Poverty

American women philanthropists
American women lawyers
Living people
Columbia Law School alumni
Harvard Graduate School of Education alumni
American nonprofit chief executives
American women chief executives
People associated with Cleary Gottlieb Steen & Hamilton
Year of birth missing (living people)
Harvard College alumni
21st-century American women